Cavagnari is an Italian surname. Notable people with the surname include: 

Domenico Cavagnari (1876–1966), Italian admiral
Lucas Covolan Cavagnari (born 1991), Brazilian footballer
Pierre Louis Napoleon Cavagnari (1841–1879), Italian-British military administrator

Italian-language surnames